Srechko Jernej "Stretch" Kontelj,  (born 1961) is a former City of Greater Geelong councillor and former mayor of the city.

Early life and education

Kontelj was born in Geelong, the son of newly arrived migrants from Slovenia.

He holds degrees in law, economics, accounting, commerce, business administration, applied corporate governance, arts, notarial practice and military law from the Universities of Monash, Melbourne, Victoria, Deakin and King's College London. In 1999 he was awarded Deakin University Law School's first Doctorate in Juridical Science.

Political career

First elected in 1998, Dr Kontelj served for 17 years on the Greater Geelong City Council, representing the Kildare Ward, which takes in Newtown, Chilwell, Manifold Heights, Herne Hill, the township of Fyansford and parts of Stonehaven.

During his time on Council, Kontelj also served as Mayor of Geelong from March 2001 until April 2002, and also served as Deputy Mayor from 27 November 2012 to 27 May 2013.

Kontelj announced his resignation from Council effective 31 July 2015, as he has taken a job with Specsavers which will see him relocate with his family to Guernsey.

Kontelj is a long-standing member of the Liberal Party. Kontelj ran unsuccessfully for the division of Corio in the 1996 Australian federal election, and for the electoral district of Geelong in the 2002 Victorian state election.

Honours
He has a long history of community involvement, particularly in supporting ethnic communities for which he was awarded an Order of Australia Medal in 2001 in the Queen's Birthday Honours List.  In 2003 Kontelj was awarded the Centenary Medal for services to Local Government, and in 2010 he was awarded the Australian Defence Medal for service to the Australian Defence Force as a Specialist Reserve Legal Officer.  In 2011, Kontelj was appointed a Notary Public servicing the greater Geelong region. In 2019, Srechko was appointed Honorary Consul of the Republic of Slovenia to the States of Guernsey, United Kingdom of Great Britain and Northern Ireland. Coinciding with the global COVID outbreak, he resigned from this role in 2020 to relocate to Australia. In 2022, Srechko was appointed Honorary Consul of the Republic of Slovenia for Victoria.

Personal life
Stretch Kontelj is married to his wife Paula, and has three children. Paula is a former radio personality on 93.9 Bay FM, and ran unsuccessfully for the seat of Geelong in the 2014 Victorian state election, representing the Liberal Party.

Kontelj's brother Eddy Kontelj has also served on the Greater Geelong City Council since 2010, representing Cowie Ward.

References

Living people
Mayors of Geelong
Recipients of the Medal of the Order of Australia
1961 births